Ratu Felisha Renatya (born October 16, 1982) better known as Ratu Felisha or Feli is an Indonesian model and actress, known for The Chanting (2006), Something in the Way (2013) and Badoet (2015).

Early life 
Ratu Felisha Renatya was born on October 16, 1982 in Jakarta, Indonesia, as the only child from Bantenese parents, Tubagus Ari Yasin and Freya Rekardini.

Personal life 
Since 2006, Felisha has adopted a child, Dasha Godiva, whom she has considered her own daughter. Felisha married Franciscus Emmanuel bin Korsten George aka Jules Korsten on December 24, 2008. But they finally decided to divorce in January 2012. After divorcing Jules Korsten, Felisha moved to Bali. Felisha met a lawyer named Ari Pujianto on April 30, 2015, they got engaged and then married on May 1, 2016 at Pondok Indah Mosque, South Jakarta. The couple then decided to follow the In vitro fertilisation program but failed. They were divorced on November 26, 2020.

Career 
Feli, as she fondly called started her career in the entertainment world as a model. The sexy poses of Felisha once adorned the adult magazine FHM. Then she starred in her first soap opera (TV series) Gerhana. The other soap operas she has starred in include Si Cecep, Inayah, Putri yang Terbuang and others.
 
In 2004, Felisha entered the film industry for the first time as she starred in Buruan Cium Gue (Hurry Kiss Me). This film had become a controversy because it was considered to have bad influence on young people. Buruan Cium Gue film was widely discussed among people after Abdullah Gymnastiar (Aa Gym, Indonesian Islamic scholars) with the board of Indonesian Ulema Council and a number of artists came to the Office of Lembaga Sensor Film (LSF, Film Censorship Institution) on Thursday, August 19, 2004. Aa Gym asked LSF to suspend the movie Buruan Cium Gue across Indonesia.

In 2006, together with Julie Estelle and Evan Sanders, Felisha played as an antagonist figure in the horror film titled Kuntilanak (the Chanting) directed by Rizal Mantovani with Raam Punjabi as the producer. This film successfully brought her name to be noticed in the Entertainment industry of Indonesia.

Filmography

Film

References

Footnotes

Works cited

External links 
  Profile in KapanLagi.com
 
 Ratu Felisha on Instagram

Living people
1982 births
People from Serang
Indonesian actresses